Locardia Ndandarika (born 1945)(died 05 January 2023) was a Zimbabwean sculptor.

A native of Bindura, as a girl Ndandarika made models in clay using traditional methods.  In 1964 she married Joseph Ndandarika, divorcing him in 1978.  During their marriage she learned more about sculpture, and later turned to it full-time.  In 1986 she became a member of the Workshop Gallery; she was also invited to work at the Chapungu Sculpture Park.  In 1990 she was invited to participate in the Commonwealth Games in New Zealand. Ndandarika has exhibited and held workshops in the United States, the Netherlands, South Africa, and New Zealand since 1997.  

She is the mother of Ronnie Dongo and Virginia Ndandarika.

References

1945 births
Living people
People from Bindura
20th-century Zimbabwean sculptors
21st-century Zimbabwean sculptors
Zimbabwean women sculptors
20th-century Zimbabwean women artists
21st-century Zimbabwean women artists